Group B of the 2013 Fed Cup Europe/Africa Zone Group II was one of two pools in the Europe/Africa zone of the 2013 Fed Cup. Four teams competed in a round-robin competition, with the top team and the bottom team proceeding to their respective sections of the play-offs: the top team played for advancement to Group I, while the bottom team faced potential relegation to Group III.

Standings

Round-robin

South Africa vs. Lithuania

Greece vs. Montenegro

South Africa vs. Montenegro

Greece vs. Lithuania

South Africa vs. Greece

Montenegro vs. Lithuania

References

External links 
 Fed Cup website

2013 Fed Cup Europe/Africa Zone